Centre for Learning Resources Centre for Learning Resources (CLR) is the name under which the non-profit Society for Educational Improvement and Innovation, registered under the Societies Registration Act of 1860, the Bombay Public Trust Act of 1950 and the Foreign Contributions Regulation Act of 1976 undertakes its educational projects. We have been working in the domains of early childhood care and development (ECCD) and elementary education since 1984. We have supported a wide range of government organizations and NGOs across the country including Maharashtra, Chhattisgarh, Jharkhand, Uttarakhand, Odisha, Uttar Pradesh, Bihar, Andhra Pradesh and Rajasthan. Offshore engagements have included Indonesia and Nepal.

Areas of work 
Since 1984, CLR has been working in the fields of Early Childhood Care and Development, Early Childhood Education, Elementary Education and the Teaching of English in Maharashtra and other states in India. Additionally, CLR works with post-secondary youth literacy too.

Background 
A large majority of children from under-served backgrounds in India are deprived of optimal levels of care and good quality education in the early years, as well in elementary education. The effects of this deprivation during the early years often cannot be overcome later in life. Research has established that the development of social behaviour, personality and intelligence occurs most rapidly in the earliest years of our lives. This is a window of opportunity to lay the foundation of health and wellbeing whose benefits last a lifetime – and carry into the next generation.

The quality of care and education that children receive in homes, in the school and pre-school systems in India, in spite of the existence of well meaning policies such as National ECCE policy, 2013, Right to Education, 2010, and National Education Policy, 2020, has been a subject of increasing, well-documented concern. Most interventions aimed at improving the situation focus on the capacity deficits of frontline workers, such as teachers, anganwadi workers and ASHAs. While that is undoubtedly a central concern, we trace the cause to a widespread deficit of effective leadership capacities in large scale systems. The focus on the greater objective in large scale systems is often lost due to various reasons, and many functionaries internalize disinterested roles in a hierarchical administrative culture that renders them powerless instead of functioning as the organisational/ community leaders they need to be. It is difficult for them to invest in capacity-building, create supportive supervision systems and provide meaning and inspiration to those who work there. Hence, the system's concern towards quality of implementation and outcomes gets adversely affected. This further impacts the largest sections of the underprivileged communities and results in millions of very young children being deprived of good quality care and education, school dropouts and dismal learning levels in young children. Our work is designed to address these challenges.

Goals  
Our primary goal is to ensure that the large majority of children from  low-income urban and rural communities have access to good quality early childhood care, development and education, as well as primary education. Towards this, we design and implement capacity-building programs with government (and non government) organizations towards enabling them to:

 Deepen their commitment and focus on their core agenda of development and education
 Cultivate a discipline of strategic long-term system-wide planning and implementation of programs
 Build a learning culture across the organization, in which each layer of the organisation takes the responsibility of training, monitoring and coaching (Triple Hat Leadership) the next layer in achieving good quality implementation
 Build capacities of the organization in three areas important for effective implementation:
 Pedagogical leadership
 Organizational leadership
 Community leadership

Our programs are designed to be medium to long term (3 to 10 years), with a typical size ranging from a few districts to a whole state.  Much of our work in recent years has focused on working with systems like the Departments of Women and Child Development, and Health, for strengthening ECCE delivery and parenting education. In the area of primary education, we have worked with Municipal and Zilla Parishad school systems, as well as the Department of Social Justice to develop system-wide capacities in teaching English as a second language. CLR places particular emphasis on capacity-building for early childhood education and parenting, seeing these periods as foundational in the long-term health of the society.

Approach and Implementation  
Theory of Change (How Change Arises)?
CLR's programs are large scale design and implementation interventions, constructed from the needs and context of the 'field', and informed as much by the team's insight and experiences as by theories and findings from multiple sciences such as child development, education, implementation science, applied psychology and organisational behaviour.

CLR creates evidence of effectiveness   →   CLR accesses and advocates to policy levers   →   CLR provides Capacity Building for building capacity within large systems   →   Cumulative and sustained change in large-scale systems that reach millions of deprived children.

Evidence of effectiveness
In the absence of much prior exposure to good practice, Governments need a live view of a model site that can demonstrate both the mechanics and the effectiveness of the practice. This evidence of effectiveness is created in pilot sites from within the system, not separate from it; the pilots, therefore, point to the potentialities of the existing large scale system. The evidence is experienced through changed anganwadis and schools, inspired champions among teachers and senior government functionaries at all levels of the hierarchy, empowered and engaged caregivers and healthy and happy children. Our monitoring & assessment processes as well as print and video documentation help codify this evidence.

Capacity-building for building capacity (C-BBC)
Even after a government adopts a new policy and a programme to support it, the capacities to implement the programme typically do not exist, simply because it is a new programme. Such capacity-building must take place during the implementation itself, given the usual time and budget constraints. This requires the government to develop new ways of knowing and behaving in at least three areas – a) the technical subject matter, b) the process of leading and managing the change/implementation at each level of the sub-systems, up to the ultimate recipient, and c) relationship with the community.
CLR's C-BBC helps governments develop leadership for large scale programme implementation. It fosters, among people at all levels, discovery of meaning in their work, personal role redefinitions, a sense of agency and competence, and the importance of relationship. It strengthens organisational processes for minimising cascade losses in learning, establishing learning and feedback channels throughout the organisation, incorporating opportunities for frequent shared reflection upon their learnings among functionaries and using multiple cycles of capacity-building. These processes are applied to each of three areas – pedagogical knowledge, organisational behaviour and community relationships.

Access to policy levers
Much research has indicated that when policy and political leadership is committed to a cause, change is not only possible but also sustained. CLR and its partners access policy levers (senior administrative officers, political leaders) with the evidence of effectiveness of our approaches. While these efforts must contend with the revolving doors and the shifting political and administrative priorities, sustained advocacy creates the space for the pilots to be extended to larger scales. We have, in this way, gone from working at the level of a lab of a few anganwadis to a block, to a district, to a few districts, to an entire state, to multiple state implementations.

Monitoring and Assessment
Monitoring and Assessment (M&A) of interventions is an integral part of our work at CLR. Through ongoing monitoring and assessment of process as well as outcome variables, CLR makes data-driven decisions related to program and implementation design. Needs and context studies, baseline, formative, and endline assessments are routinely conducted during the course of CLR's intervention

Programmes 
Current and Recent Projects

Early Childhood care, Development and Education 

Sajag Abhiyan

 A series of audio-based tutorials, aimed at caregiver coaching for nurturing care (CCNC), was launched as a response to the Covid 19 situation. 
 Our projects in all locations were quickly adapted to the Sajag Abhiyan so that we could continue to offer the much-needed support and guidance to children and their families during the pandemic. 
 The programme is currently live in Chhattisgarh, Bihar, Goa, Uttarakhand, Lucknow and Pune. Given below are the programme details-
 Sajag Abhiyan- Chhattisgarh (April 2020- ongoing), Partner Organisation- Department of Women and Child Development, Chhattisgarh and UNICEF
 Sajag Abhiyan Bihar (September 2020- ongoing), Partner Organisation- Department of Women and Child Development, Bihar and UNICEF
 Sajag Abhiyan- Goa (September 2020- ongoing), Partner Organisation- Department of Women and Child Development, Goa
 Sajag Abhiyan- Udham Singh Nagar (December 2020-ongoing), Partner Organisation-Department of Women and Child Development, Uttarakhand
 The Sajag Audio series is also being implemented in Uttar Pradesh (in Lucknow city) and Pune (one ICDS project).
ICDS Leadership Program- Bihar (2018- ongoing), Partner Organisation- Department of Women and Child Development, Bihar and UNICEF
 ILP Bihar aims to enhance the leadership capacities of CDPO's and Lady Supervisors of the two districts of Gaya and Purnea so that they can inspire the adoption of a good quality ECCE Programme by the State's Anganwadi workers. 
 25 CDPO's, about 170 lady Supervisors and nearly 7,000 Anganwadi workers participate in the programme.
 In addition, CLR helps build the capacities of the state ECCE Core Committee members on curriculum development and review, capacity-building processes, procurement processes and use of zero cost/low-cost materials, monitoring and evaluation and community engagement processes. 

Sanskar Abhiyan Chhattisgarh (2017- ongoing), Partner organisation- DWCD and UNICEF
 Sanskar Abhiyan is the State wide implementation of ECCE across the entire state. 

 In 2017 CLR conducted a State Level training for the 45 State Level Master Trainers who in turn trained the around 1800 District Level Master Trainers (DLMTs including DPOs, CDPOs and Supervisors. The DLMTs took the training to 50,000 AWWs in the State. 

 In the first cycle of the Second phase of Sanskar Abhiyan, CLR has trained 63 DPOs, DWCDOs, some Deputy Director-level officers of DWCD and a few select SLMTs.  The implementation of the Second cycle at district-level was interrupted due to the lock down imposed upon by the Corona virus situation and is expected to pick-up when normalcy is restored.

Lucknow ECCD Centre-Vinayakpuram 'Shishuvan' (2018-ongoing), Partner Organisation- HCL Foundation
 CLR collaborated with HCL Foundation to set up an ECCD Centre in the urban community of Lucknow- Vinayakpuram in the year 2018.
 The centre (known as 'Shishuvan') provides a holistic development environment to 31 children of the community. Children of the age 6 months to 6 years stay at the centre from morning 9 to evening 4 pm. 
 As part of program, incremental training cycles on ECCE and stimulation are being conducted for the workers and helpers of the Centre.
 AWCs in Lucknow (2018-ongoing), Partner Organisation- HCL Foundation
 Under this program, CLR trains and supports 15 Anganwadi workers in implementation of ECCE in their Anganwadi centres. 
 Incremental cyclical trainings of the workers are conducted on ECCE, which cover pedagogical understanding and play and activities for different developmental domains like cognitive, social, language, physical and creative

English Language Learning and School Leadership 

The English Language Improvement and School Leadership Program (ELISLP) (2018- ongoing), Partner Organisation- Department of Social Justice and Special Assistance, Maharashtra and TATA Trusts 

 ELIP was aimed at improving English listening, speaking and reading comprehension in secondary school students in Scheduled caste (SC) and Navbodh (NB) Residential Schools.

 The project includes implementation in 74 schools that are located in 26 districts of Maharashtra, reaching approximately 9000 students in Classes 6, 7 and 8.

 A baseline was conducted at the beginning of the project, followed by a year-end evaluation has shown marked improvement in the students' listening and speaking skills.

 Teachers have been very enthusiastic about implementing the programs and have noted how it has helped boost their confidence and increase their enthusiasm to teach English innovatively.

We Learn English Program, Chirag Uttarakhand
 CLRs "We Learn English Programme" was implemented in 45 Schools in Kumaon region of Uttarakhand in partnership with NGO CHIRAG (Central Himalayan Rural Action Group) between (2016-2018). The program focused on building English Speaking and Comprehension skills in primary school children.   

Implementation of We Learn English Radio Program- Jalgaon District
 In 2016, CLR in partnership with Jalgaon Zilla Parishad Education Department undertook a 3 year long implementation of the radio programme "Aamhi Ingraji Shikto / We Learn English". 

 WLE Programme was implemented in Classes 3, 4 and 5 in all Jalgaon Zilla Parishad (ZP) primary/upper primary schools, Private schools and Municipal corporation schools. The lessons were broadcast using the All India Radio (AIR) facilities in Jalgaon.

Implementation of We Learn English Radio Programme – Ahmednagar District
 Zilla Parishad Ahmednagar has implemented Level 1 of CLR's WLE programme in its nearly 3,500 schools in 2013- 14.
 The programme was delivered in Class 4 through Akashvani broadcast thrice in a week. 
Implementation of English Language Improvement Programme – Pune Municipal Corporation schools

 We Learn English (WLE) Radio Programme and LRWE (Let's Read and Write English) was implemented in 250 PMC schools over the period 2010-13. 
 CLR also undertook the capacity-building of a group of teacher mentors as a long-term resource within PMC school board. The teacher mentors were drawn from the English teacher pool itself and spent an initial orientation workshop of 15 days and a continuing workshop once a week with CLR experts. They undertook the mentoring of nearly 100 English teachers within the system as they implemented the WLE and LRWE programmes.

We Learn English – Uttar Pradesh
 In July 2017, CLR trained district coordinators in Uttar Pradesh on the WLE programme which was implemented by Sarva Shiksha Abhiyan (SSA). This programme aims to reach 40,000 schools across 75 districts in Uttar Pradesh. Monitoring and supervision support was also provided by SSA. The trainings were arranged by District Institute for Education and Training (DIET), Lucknow, in collaboration with UNICEF-UP.

References

External links 
 Official Website
 Academic Issues and Challenges in Teaching English in Mainstream Regional Medium Schools", The Learning Curve, Issue XIII, October 2009, Azim Premji Foundation.
 "2020 Vision: Improving Secondary Education is Not Just a Game", The Indian Express, July 31, 2009.
 "Marks Mask Incompetence: Our High School Students have Low Levels of Learning", The Times of India, July 22, 2008.
 "Say No to Rote Learning: India's Best Schools are Mediocre by World Standards", The Times of India, December 17, 2007.
 "The Teaching of Reading in Our Primary Schools: Some Critical Issues", ASER Discussion Series – Volume 2, July 2007.
 "Teach me English", The Times of India, October 7, 2006.
 "When the Teacher does not Know" The Times of India, September 30, 2006.
 "Teach First: Ensure Instruction in Schools before Innovation", The Times of India, October 27, 2004.
 "The English Juggernaut: Regional Medium Schools in Crisis", The Times of India, April 30, 2004.
 "Learning Without Teaching", The Hindu, January 3, 2001.
 "English Lessons: Bridgehead to Greater Opportunities", The Times of India, January 13, 2000.
 "Illiteracy By Schooling: Neglecting Children's Learning Skills", The Times of India, November 11, 1999.

Organisations based in Pune
Educational organisations based in India
1984 establishments in Maharashtra
Organizations established in 1984